The Grand National Hurdle Stakes is an American National Steeplechase Association sanctioned steeplechase race run each fall at Far Hills, New Jersey. It is a Grade 1 event run over  miles. It has been known by a variety of names over the years, including the Breeders' Cup Grand National.

The race dates back to 1899 where it was first run at Morris Park Racecourse. It was long the premier stakes in U.S. jump racing.  Past winners include 11 of the 14 steeplechasers inducted into the National Museum of Racing and Hall of Fame: Flatterer (also a close second in the 1987 Champion Hurdle), Zaccio, Café Prince, Bon Nouvel, Neji, Oedipus, Elkridge, Bushranger, Battleship (in 1938 became the only winner of this race and the Aintree Grand National), Jolly Roger and Good and Plenty.

The race has also been held at Belmont Park and Saratoga Race Course as well as the steeplechase meets at Fair Hill, Maryland and Charlottesville, Virginia.

The Grand National (sometimes called the American Grand National to distinguish it from the race held at Aintree in England) is one of the oldest races in steeplechasing and one of the most important outside Europe. The day of steeplechasing at Far Hills includes seven races, the most important of which is the Grand National.

Winners of the Grand National since 1998

Earlier winners
 1997 - Rowdy Irishman
 1996 - Correggio
 1995 - Rowdy Irishman
 1994 - Warm Spell
 1993 - Runway Romance (American Grand National)
 1993 - Lonesome Glory (Breeders' Cup Steeplechase)
 1992 - Highland Bud
 1991 - Morley Street (English champion)
 1990 - Morley Street
 1989 - Highland Bud
 1988 - Jimmy Lorenzo (US champion)
 1987 - Gacko (French champion)
 1986 - Census (multiple graded stakes winner)

References

Horse races in New Jersey
Graded stakes races in the United States
Grade 1 stakes races in the United States
Steeplechase (horse racing)
Grand National